Yanggu may refer to;

 Yanggu County, Shandong (阳谷县), of Liaocheng, Shandong, China
 Yanggu County, Gangwon (楊口郡), county of Gangwon Province, South Korea